In France under the Ancien Régime, a states provincial or estates provincial (états provinciaux) was an assembly of the three estates of a province, "regularly constituted, periodically convoked and possessing certain political and administrative functions, of which the main one was to vote on the impôt". Only the pays d'état had rights to such estates. This arose from the specific legal conditions of their historical incorporation into the royal domain (e.g., Burgundy, Foix, Languedoc) or into France itself (e.g., Béarn, Corsica, Dauphiné).

Within a pays d'état, regions could have their own particular estates, the états particuliers ("estates particular"). For example, in Burgundy the counties (comtés) of Auxerre, Bar-sur-Seine, Charolais and the Mâconnais each had their own  états particuliers in the early modern period. These would send representatives to the Burgundian états provinciaux in Dijon. Only the Mâconnais retained its own états in 1789; the rest had been absorbed into the Burgundian estates general. The impôts were the provincial estates' main preoccupation and raison d'être throughout the ancien régime. Their formal assent to the impôts was generally accompanied by the drafting of complaints to send to the king or his councils.

In contrast to the pays d'état, any area where impôts were fixed by the king's representatives (known as the élus) were known as pays d'élection. This distinction was abolished during the French Revolution in 1789. A third category, "pays d'imposition" was used for recently conquered lands which had their own local institutions (they were similar to the "pays d'état" under which they are sometimes grouped), although taxation was overseen by the royal intendant.

List of states-provincial and -particular in 1789
Estates of Artois
Estates of Béarn
Estates of Bigorre
Estates of Bresse
Estates of Brittany
Estates of Bugey
Estates of Burgundy
Estates of Cambrésis
Estates of Charolais
Estates of Corsica
Estates of Dauphiné
Estates of Flanders
Estates of Foix
Estates of Gévaudan
Estates of Hainaut
Estates of Labourd
Estates of Languedoc
Estates of Marsan
Estates of Navarre
Estates of Nébouzan
Estates of Provence
Estates of Quatre-Vallées
Estates of Soule
Estates of Velay
Estates of Vivarais

Notes